Confessions of an Opium Eater also known as Souls for Sale and Evils of Chinatown is a 1962 American crime film produced and directed by Albert Zugsmith. It is loosely based on the 1822 autobiographical novel Confessions of an English Opium-Eater, written by Thomas De Quincey. After circulating for years as a bootleg, it was released on DVD as part of the Warner Archive Collection in 2012.

This film stars Vincent Price as Gilbert de Quincey, a nineteenth-century adventurer who becomes involved in a tong war in San Francisco. Price also narrated the film, whose evocative cinematography resembles a nightmare. The film was something of a departure for Price; the prolific actor never performed another role that involved so much physical action.

Plot
In 1902, adventurer Gilbert De Quincey, a descendant of Thomas De Quincey. is hired by the editor of a Chinese newspaper to stop auctions of trafficked Chinese women to be the brides of Chinese men resident in the United States. The community is split down the middle with those feeling the traditional practice is the only way for overseas Chinese to obtain brides, and those who regard the practise as indecent.

Cast
 Vincent Price as Gilbert De Quincey
 Linda Ho as Ruby Low
 Richard Loo as George Wah
 June Kyoto Lu as Lotus (as June Kim)
 Philip Ahn as Ching Foon
 Yvonne Moray as the midget girl with sing-sing voice
 Caroline Kido as Lo Tsen
 Terence De Marney as Englishman in opium den

Reception
In 1998, Jonathan Rosenbaum of the Chicago Reader included the film in his unranked list of the best American films not included on the AFI Top 100.

Quotes
I am De Quincey. I dream, and I create dreams — out of the opium pipe. I see sailing into our vision a junk. Its cargo: women. Women bought or stolen from all over the mysterious Orient. Their destination, and mine: the human auctions in Chinatown.

Trivia

James Hong was given a script in 1962. He thought it was terrible – "all the roles were the opium dope people and the prostitutes and so forth." He and approached Albert Zugsmith to make a case for a rewrite.

See also
List of American films of 1962
Confessions of an English Opium-Eater
Opium
Thomas De Quincey

References

External links

1962 films
1962 crime drama films
American crime drama films
American black-and-white films
Allied Artists films
Films based on non-fiction books
Films set in San Francisco
Films scored by Albert Glasser
Chinatown, San Francisco in fiction
Films about race and ethnicity
Films about opium
1960s exploitation films
Psychedelic films
Surrealist films
Works about human trafficking
Works about sex trafficking
Human trafficking in the United States
Films about human trafficking in the United States
Films about substance abuse
Films set in 1902
1960s English-language films
Films directed by Albert Zugsmith
1960s American films